Swap Meet is a 1979 American comedy film directed by Brice Mack.

Cast
Ruth Cox as Nancy
Debi Richter as Susan
Danny Goldman as Ziggy
Cheryl Rixon as Annie
Jon Gries as Dan Spector
Danny DeVito as Max the auto body mechanic
Rhea Perlman as Shoplifting Mother

Release 
Swap Meet released to theaters in the United States on September 21, 1979.

Reception 
The Los Angeles Times panned the film, saying that it "makes no attempt to be either lifelike or interesting." TV Guide was similarly critical, writing that it was "A real waste of time, this is aimed strictly at the drive-in crowds who aren't concerned with cinematic quality to begin with."

References

External links

Films directed by Brice Mack
1979 films
American comedy films
1979 comedy films
Films produced by Steve Krantz
1970s English-language films
1970s American films